BNET was an online magazine dedicated to issues of business management.

It was owned by CBS Interactive and was a part of its business portfolio alongside ZDNet, TechRepublic, SmartPlanet.

BNET site registration allowed users to receive several e-newsletters, download certain whitepapers, and post comments on their site. BNET was one of the top 10 financial news & research sites on the Internet from May 2007 to May 2008, according to comScore's rankings. In 2012, BNET was merged into CBS MoneyWatch.com.

References 

Matthew Schwartz,  "CNET Networks rolls out BNET, Web site targeting business managers," B to B, March 1, 2007
Terrence Russell, "CNet Buys FindArticles From a Similarly Regrouping LookSmart," Wired Blog Network, November 8, 2007

External links 
BNET website

Business magazines published in the United States
Online magazines published in the United States
Defunct CBS Interactive websites
Defunct magazines published in the United States
Magazines established in 2007
Magazines disestablished in 2012
Magazines published in San Francisco